The Mathews family is an American political family descended from John Mathews (d. 1757) and Ann Archer, originating in colonial Virginia and active in Virginia and the American South in the 18th–20th centuries.

The family origins are unclear, though most researchers believe that the family founders arrived in America around 1730 with the Scotch-Irish immigration, settling in Augusta County (present-day Rockbridge County), Virginia. Several members played a role in the American Revolution, and numerous members were elected to the Virginia General Assembly over successive generations, while additionally members have been involved in the politics of West Virginia, Georgia, and other U.S. states in roles including state governor and state legislator, among others. Members have served in the U.S. military as generals, colonels, and other officers. Notable members include George Mathews, Sampson Mathews, Henry M. Mathews, and Mason Mathews Patrick.

British origin

The Mathews family is believed to be of Scotch-Irish and/or possibly Welsh ethnicity. Numerous, sometimes conflicting family traditions exist regarding the Old World origins of John Mathews (d. 1757). Several of these traditions hold that Mathews was a descendant of a Welsh Mathew family, of which there existed branches throughout Britain in the 17th and 18th centuries. However, these traditions lack corroborating records and/or remain speculative. Mathews likely immigrated to America during early years of the Scotch-Irish immigration of 1717–1775. The female progenitor of the family, Ann Archer, immigrated to America during this period, and was of Scotch-Irish ethnicity.

Overview
John Mathews settled in Augusta County, Virginia around 1737 and held several local offices in the community. Several of his sons took part in patriot efforts during the American Revolutionary War; Sampson Mathews (c. 1737–1807) and George Mathews (1739–1812) were members of the Augusta County Committee of Safety, which drafted the Augusta Resolves and the Augusta Declaration. In total, three of Mathews’ sons served as wartime Virginia legislators: Sampson Mathews and George Mathews from Augusta County and Archer Mathews (1744–) from Greenbrier County. Additionally, Sampson Mathews was a lieutenant colonel of Virginia militia, and George Mathews was a brevet brigadier general in the Continental Army. George Mathews was later a U.S. House Representative to the First Congress and a governor of Georgia.

George Mathews' son George Mathews Jr. (1774–1836) was a judge of the Superior Courts of the territories of Mississippi and Orleans and as the presiding judge of the Louisiana Supreme Court. George Mathews Jr.'s brother, John Mathews (c.1762–1806), was a federal Supervisor of Revenue from Georgia. In Virginia, three more members of the family from the third generation served in the state legislature: Sampson Mathews' son Sampson Mathews Jr. from Bath County, and John Mathews (1768–1849) and James W. Mathews (d. 1825), grandsons of John Mathews through his son William Mathews (1741–1772), from Greenbrier County.

From the fourth generation, Mason Mathews (1803–1878), a grandson of William Mathews, served in the Virginia legislature from Greenbrier County. During the American Civil War, three of his sons served as Confederate States Army officers. His son Henry M. Mathews (1834–1884) later served as an attorney general and governor of West Virginia. Henry M. Mathews' son, William G. Mathews (1877–1923), was a federal judge in Kanawha, West Virginia and a candidate for the West Virginia Supreme Court. Mason M. Patrick (1863–1942), grandson of Mason Mathews, served as Chief of the U.S. Army Air Service, American Expeditionary Force during World War I and the Interwar Period. He authored the 1926 congressional bill that created the U.S. Army Air Corps from the Air Service, and served as its first chief.

Other relations include Thomas Posey (1750–1818), U.S. Senator from Louisiana; Peter J. Otey (1840–1902), U.S. House Representative from Virginia; and George Mathews Edgar (1837–1913), President of University of Arkansas.

Offices held
A list of offices held by members of the Mathews family. 

John Mathews (d.1757), Justice of Augusta County, Virginia, 1747–1757; Virginia Colonial Militia Captain. Father of Joshua, Sampson, George, Archer, and William Mathews.
Joshua Mathews (d.1763), son of John Mathews.
Martha Mathews (1754–1778), ∞ Thomas Posey (1750–1818), U.S. Senator from Louisiana, 1812–1813; 2nd Governor of Indiana Territory, 1813–1816; Lt. Governor of Kentucky, 1806–1808; Kentucky State Senator, 1804–1806. Daughter of Joshua Mathews.
Sampson Mathews (c. 1737–1807), Virginia State Senator from Augusta County and surrounding counties, 1776–1781, 1791–1792; Virginia State Militia Lieutenant Colonel; Virginia Colonial Militia Captain. Son of John Mathews.
Sampson Mathews Jr., Virginia House Delegate from Bath County, 1809–1810. Son of Sampson Mathews
Sampson L. Mathews. Surveyor of Pocahontas County, West Virginia. Son of Sampson Mathews Jr.
Mary A. Mathews, ∞ William H. McClintic (1825–1892). Daughter of Sampson L. Mathews.
George W. McClintic (1866–1942), Judge of the United States District Court for the Southern District of West Virginia 1921–1942; West Virginia House Delegate 1919–1921. Son of Mary A. Mathews.
Lockart Mathews McClintic (1860–1928) West Virginia House Delegate, dates unknown 
George Mathews (1739–1812), 20th & 24st Governor of Georgia, 1787–1788 & 1793–1796; U.S. House Representative from Georgia's 3rd congressional district, 1789–1791; Georgia Assemblyman from Wilkes County, 1786; Virginia Burgess from Augusta County, 1775; Continental Army Brigadier General. Son of John Mathews.
John Mathews (c.1762–1806), Supervisor of Revenue for Georgia, 1794–1796. Son of George Mathews.
Ann Mathews (±1767–1840), ∞ Samuel Blackburn (1759–1835), Virginia House Delegate from Bath County, 1799–1801, 1809–1813; Georgia Assemblyman, 1795. Daughter of George Mathews.
George Mathews Jr. (1774–1836), Presiding Judge of the Louisiana Supreme Court, 1813–1836; Judge of the Superior courts of the Territory of Orleans, 1806–1813; Judge of the Superior Courts of the Territory of Mississippi 1805–1806. Son of George Mathews.
Charles L. Mathews (1776–1842), ∞ Lucy Early, sister of Peter Early (1773–1818), 28th Governor of Georgia.
William Mathews (1741–1772), Justice of Botetourt County, 1770–1772. Son of John Mathews
Elizabeth Mathews (±1766–1853), ∞ Isaac Otey (1766–1850), Virginia House Delegate from Bedford County, 1798–1813. Daughter of William Mathews
Isaac Otey Jr., Virginia State Senator from Bedford and surrounding counties, 1821–1825; Virginia House Delegate, 1820–1821. Son of Elizabeth Mathews.
John M. Otey (1792–1859), President of Lynchburg, Virginia City Council, 1841–1859. Son of Elizabeth Mathews.
Peter J. Otey (1840–1902), U.S. House Representative from Virginia's 6th congressional district, 1895–1902; delegate to the 1896 Democratic National Convention. Son of John M. Otey.
James H. Otey (1800–1863), first Episcopal Bishop of Tennessee. Son of Elizabeth Mathews.
John Mathews (1768–1849), Virginia House Delegate from Greenbrier County, 1798–1801, 1803–1804, 1813–1814, 1816, 1829; Federalist candidate for U.S. House of Representatives, 1815; Clerk of Greenbrier County, Virginia 1831–1849. Son of William Mathews.
Frances Crow Mathews (b. 1814) ∞ Robert C. J. Cary. Daughter of John Mathews.
Roberta Elizabeth Cary (b. 1836) ∞ Ovid A. Kinsolving (1822–1894). Daughter of Frances Crow Mathews.
Wythe Leigh Kinsolving (1878–1964), Democratic Party political advocate; speaker at the 1924 Democratic National Convention.
Ophelia Mathews ∞ William Cary. Daughter of John Mathews.
Henrietta H. Cary ∞ Adam Clarke Snydor (1834–1896) Justice of the Supreme Court of West Virginia 1882–1890. Daughter of Ophelia Mathews.
James W. Mathews (d. 1825), Virginia House Delegate from Greenbrier County, 1802–1803; United States Army Major. Son of William Mathews.
Joseph Mathews (1770–1834), Son of William Mathews.
Mason Mathews (1803–1878), Virginia House Delegate from Greenbrier County, 1859–1865; ∞ Eliza Shore Reynolds (1808–1872), sister of Alexander W. Reynolds (1817–1876), Confederate States Army Brigadier General. Son of Joseph Mathews.
Henry M. Mathews (1834–1884), 5th Governor of West Virginia, 1877–1881; 7th Attorney General of West Virginia; West Virginia State Senator 1865; Confederate States Army Major. Son of Mason Mathews.
William G. Mathews (1877–1923), Referee in Bankruptcy for Kanawha, West Virginia, 1898–1908, Clerk of Kanawha, West Virginia, 1903–1904. Democratic Candidate for the West Virginia Supreme Court of Appeals, 1908; alternate delegate to the 1904 Democratic National Convention from West Virginia. Son of Henry M. Mathews.
Alexander F. Mathews (1838–1906), Delegate to 1888 Democratic National Convention from West Virginia; Presidential Elector for West Virginia, 1904; West Virginia University Regent, 1871–1881; Confederate States Army Captain. Son of Mason Mathews.
Mason Mathews (1867–1928), Alternate delegate to 1912 Democratic National Convention from West Virginia. Son of Alexander F. Mathews.
Virginia A. Mathews (d. 1923), ∞ Alfred S. Patrick (1831–1906), son of Spicer Patrick (1791–1884), Speaker of the West Virginia House of Delegates 1863–1864; West Virginia Senator 1870–1871. Daughter of Mason Mathews.
 Mason M. Patrick (1863–1942), Chief of U.S. Army Air Service, American Expeditionary Force, 1917–1918; Chief of U.S. Army Air Service, 1921–1926; Chief of U.S. Army Air Corps, 1926–1927; U.S. Army Major General; Public Utilities Commissioner for the District of Columbia, 1929–1933. Son of Virginia A. Mathews.
Archer Mathews (1744–), Virginia House Delegate from Greenbrier County, 1780–1782. Son of John Mathews.
Ann Mathews (1765–1852), ∞ Thomas Edgar (1754–1822), Justice of Greenbrier County and Rockbridge County, Virginia; son of Thomas Edgar, Virginia House Delegate from Greenbrier County. Daughter of Archer Mathews.
George M. Edgar (1837–1913), President of University of Arkansas, 1884–1887; President of Florida State University, 1887–1892.

Other Mathews of Virginia 

Other Mathews have played an important role in the public life of Virginia. Captain Samuel Matthews immigrated from England to Jamestown, Virginia around 1622, and his son Samuel Mathews (1630–1660) served as a commonwealth governor of Virginia.

Thomas Mathews (1742–1812), a speaker of the Virginia House of Delegates, immigrated from Saint Kitts, West Indies, to the Piedmont region of Virginia in the years before the American Revolution. Both Samuel and Thomas Mathews have been connected to the Mathews of Virginia by some writers and historians, though the connection has not been noted by others.

References

Bibliography
 
 
 
 
 

 
 
 

American families
American families of Scotch-Irish ancestry
Augusta County, Virginia
Bath County, Virginia
Botetourt County, Virginia
Families from Virginia
Families from West Virginia
Greenbrier County, West Virginia
Mathews family of Virginia and West Virginia
Political families of Virginia
Political families of the United States
West Feliciana Parish, Louisiana
Wilkes County, Georgia
Wood County, West Virginia